Mastigophorus is a genus of moths of the family Noctuidae described by Poey in 1832.

Description
Male with palpi with first joint upcurved at base, then porrect (extending forward) extremely long and fringed with hair above. Second joint bent back at an acute angle to above vertex of head. Third joint is a flattened process with a tuft of long hair from its base. Antennae with long bristles and cilia. Thorax and abdomen smoothly scaled. Tibia slightly hairy. Forewings with slightly acute apex. Hindwings with vein 5 from near lower angle of cell.

Female with palpi with short first joint and curved or obliquely upturned second joint, which is moderate length. Third joint upturned, long and very slender. American specimens have a sheath to the fore tibia containing a mass of flocculent (wooly) scales.

Species
According to Lepidoptera and Other Life Forms:
Mastigophorus asynetalis Dyar, 1918 found in Mexico
Mastigophorus augustus Schaus, 1916 Cayenne (French Guiana)
Mastigophorus demissalis (Möschler, 1890) Puerto Rico, Colombia, Suriname
Mastigophorus evadnealis Schaus, 1913 Costa Rica
Mastigophorus jamaicalis  Schaus, 1916 Jamaica
Mastigophorus majoralis Schaus, 1916 Mexico
Mastigophorus marima (Felder & Rogenhofer, 1874) Brazil
Mastigophorus nomius Schaus, 1916 Cayenne
Mastigophorus parra Poey, 1832 Cuba

References
Citations

Sources

Herminiinae